Mukachevo Raion is a raion (district) of Zakarpattia Oblast (province) of Ukraine. Mukachevo is the administrative center of the raion. Its population is 

On 18 July 2020, as part of the administrative reform of Ukraine, the number of raions of Zakarpattia Oblast was reduced to six, and the area of Mukachevo Raion was significantly expanded. The January 2020 estimate of the raion population was 

Residents in seven villages of the raion have the option to learn the Hungarian language in a school or home school environment.

Urban-type settlements

Villages

References

Raions of Zakarpattia Oblast
1953 establishments in Ukraine